The Guy Who Came Back is a 1951 film made by 20th Century Fox, directed by Joseph M. Newman, and starring Paul Douglas, Joan Bennett, and Linda Darnell. The screenplay was written by Allan Scott, based on story by William Fay.

Plot
Injured and out of shape, "Hurricane" Harry Joplin is unhappy about not being accepted for World War II duty by the Navy and unhappier still when the New York Titans decline to offer him a new contract, suggesting he become a coach instead. Harry refuses to believe his football days are over.

While his wife Kathy supports the family, Harry spends time with his son, Willie, teaching him football. But while battling his depression, Harry becomes attracted to Dee Shane, who persuades him to become an entertainer, telling his old football stories on stage. Harry thinks he's a natural for that, but flops before a big audience and proceeds to go on a three-day drinking binge.

Kathy begins seeing another man, Gordon, and it appears Harry has lost her. He tries wrestling to make a living, but his heart isn't in it. His old football coach gives Harry a last shot in a big game against the Navy, but he plays poorly and is benched. Harry asks if he can remain on the sideline for the sake of his son in the bleachers. When the war-depleted team runs out of healthy bodies, though, Harry is needed again and scores a touchdown.

Delighted to win the game and his wife back, Harry is willing to accept a coaching job now. But before he can, an admiral who saw the football game offers gladly to  induct a man fit enough to sink the Navy on this field of battle.

Main cast
Paul Douglas as  Harry Joplin  
Linda Darnell as  Dee Shane 
Joan Bennett as  Kathy Joplin
Don DeFore as  Gordon Towne

External links
 
 
 The Guy Who Came Back at Allmovie

1951 films
American black-and-white films
1951 drama films
American drama films
Films directed by Joseph M. Newman
Films scored by Leigh Harline
20th Century Fox films
1950s English-language films
1950s American films